Robert Keith (born Rolland Keith Richey, February 10, 1898– December 22, 1966) was an American stage and film actor who appeared in several dozen films, mostly in the 1950s as a character actor.

Early life

Keith was born in Fowler, Indiana, the son of Mary Della (née Snyder) and James Haughey Richey.

Career
He portrayed characters such as the father in Fourteen Hours (1951) and a psychopathic gangster in The Lineup (1958).

His also played the police chief and father of biker Marlon Brando's love interest in the 1953 film The Wild One and as another cop, this time Brando's antagonist, in the film musical, Guys and Dolls.

Keith had a large supporting role in Douglas Sirk's Written on the Wind. He had roles on television, including a role as Richard Kimble's father in The Fugitive and lead roles on episodes of Alfred Hitchcock Presents ("Ten O'Clock Tiger" & "Final Escape") and The Twilight Zone ("The Masks"), which was his last screen effort, in the role of Jason Foster, the rich New Orleans patriarch to a family waiting for their benefactor to die.  He appeared as scientist Garson Lee in a 1954 episode of The Motorola Television Hour "Atomic Attack."

Personal life
Keith's second wife was stage actress Helena Shipman, with whom he had a son, actor Brian Keith.  

On April 18, 1927, Keith married Peg Entwistle, an actress who was a decade his junior. They were divorced in 1929, with Entwistle citing abuse and domestic cruelty in her divorce filing. Entwistle also stated that Keith had deceived her into believing that he had never been married before. Keith married his fourth wife, Dorothy Tierney, in a secret wedding ceremony on an undisclosed date in 1930. They met in late 1929 while both were acting at different theatres in the San Francisco Bay Area. The couple remained together until Keith's death on December 22, 1966. Among the honorary pallbearers at his funeral were Ronald Reagan, Edward G. Robinson, and James Cagney.

Partial filmography

 The Other Kind of Love (1924) as George Benton
 Abraham Lincoln (1930) as Union Courier (uncredited)
 Just Imagine (1930) as Chorus Man (uncredited)
 White Shoulders (1931) as Bit Part (uncredited)
 Bad Company (1931) as Crump aka Professor aka Prof (uncredited)
 The Shadow Laughs (1933) as George Hackett
 Boomerang! (1947) as 'Mac' McCreery
 My Foolish Heart (1949) as Henry Winters
 The Reformer and the Redhead (1950) as Tim Harveigh
 Edge of Doom (1950) as Detective Lieutenant Mandel
 Woman on the Run (1950) as Inspector Ferris
 Branded (1950) as T. Jefferson Leffingwell
 Fourteen Hours (1951) as Paul E. Cosick
 Here Comes the Groom (1951) as George Degnan
 I Want You (1951) as Thomas Greer
 Just Across the Street (1952) as Walter Medford
 Somebody Loves Me (1952) as Sam Doyle
 Battle Circus (1953) as Lieutenant Colonel Hilary Whalters
 Small Town Girl (1953) as Judge Gordon Kimbell
 Devil's Canyon (1953) as Warden Steve Morgan
 The Wild One (1953) as Police Chief Harry Bleeker
 Drum Beat (1954) as Bill Satterwhite
 Young at Heart (1954) as Gregory Tuttle
 Underwater! (1955) as Father Cannon
 Love Me or Leave Me (1955) as Bernard V. Loomis
 Guys and Dolls (1955) as Lieutenant Brannigan
 Ransom! (1956) as Police Chief Jim Backett
 Between Heaven and Hell (1956) as Col. Cousins
 Written on the Wind (1956) as Jasper Hadley
 Men in War (1957) as The Colonel
 My Man Godfrey (1957) as Alexander Bullock
 The Lineup (1958) as Julian
 Tempest (1958) as Capt. Miranov
 They Came to Cordura (1959) as Colonel Rogers
 Cimarron (1960) as Sam Pegler
 Posse from Hell (1961) as Captain Jeremiah Brown
 Duel of Champions (1961) as Tullio Hostilio, King of Rome

References

External links

1898 births
1966 deaths
Male actors from Indiana
20th-century American male actors
American male film actors
American male television actors
People from Lafayette, Indiana
People from Fowler, Indiana
Burials at Holy Cross Cemetery, Culver City